Orlanda Lynch (born 29 January 1947) is a Surinamese former discus thrower, shot putter, javelin thrower and sprinter. She is best known for winning bronze medals in both the discus and the shot put at the 1971 Central American and Caribbean Championships in Athletics in Kingston, Jamaica and for winning a bronze medal in the shot put in the 1975 Central American and Caribbean Championships in Athletics in Ponce, Puerto Rico.

Lynch also represented Suriname at the 1974 Central American and Caribbean Games in Santo Domingo and the 1978 Central American and Caribbean Games in Medellín, Colombia. In addition, she also represented Suriname at the 1975 Pan American Games in Mexico City, placing eighth in the shot put and tenth in the discus.

Lynch is still the female Surinamese record holder in the discus, with a throw of 40.52 metres set on 7 March 1976 in Paramaribo.

References

Living people
1947 births
Surinamese female discus throwers
Surinamese female shot putters
Surinamese female javelin throwers
Surinamese female sprinters
Competitors at the 1974 Central American and Caribbean Games
Competitors at the 1978 Central American and Caribbean Games
Athletes (track and field) at the 1975 Pan American Games
Pan American Games competitors for Suriname
Place of birth missing (living people)